"Anything Goes" is the first single released from Ras Kass' debut album, Soul on Ice. Produced and written by Ras Kass himself, "Anything Goes" peaked at 20 on the Hot Rap Singles and #1 on the Bubbling Under R&B/Hip-Hop Songs.

Single track listing
"Anything Goes" (Radio)   
"Anything Goes" (LP Version)   
"Anything Goes" (Instrumental)   
"On Earth As It Is..." (Radio)   
"On Earth As It Is..." (LP Version)   
"On Earth As It Is..." (Xplicit A Capella)   
"Anything Goes" (Radio A Capella)

Charts

References

1996 singles
Ras Kass songs
1996 songs